"Intimidation Game" is the fourteenth episode of the sixteenth season of the police procedural television series Law & Order: Special Victims Unit. The episode aired on February 11, 2015 on NBC. In the episode, which was loosely inspired by the Gamergate controversy, a female video game developer is harassed and threatened by a group of misogynistic cyber terrorists. The episode featured guest appearances from  Logan Paul, Toby Turner, Jack Vale and James Ciccone.

Synopsis
Video game developer Raina Punjabi (Mouzam Makkar) ignores warnings from online predators as the release date of her game arrives. When a female employee is soon assaulted at a game convention, the detectives ask Punjabi to halt the game's release. When she refuses, Fin and SVU must race to protect her from technically skilled predators that want to see Punjabi out of the gaming business.

Reception

Critical response
Announced on January 29, 2015 and aired on NBC in the United States on February 11, 2015, the episode received negative reviews for its portrayal of gaming culture and sexism in video games.

Ratings
According to TV by the Numbers, the episode's original broadcast was watched by 6.12 million viewers and acquired a 1.4 rating/4% share in the 18–49 demographic.

References

External links
 
 Law & Order: SVU–Episode Guide–Intimidation Game

Law & Order: Special Victims Unit episodes
2015 American television episodes
Internet memes introduced in 2015
Television episodes directed by Jean de Segonzac